In the issue dated March 16, 1985, Billboard magazine debuted its first chart devoted exclusively to 12-inch Singles Sales.  The 50-position weekly ranking joined Billboards established Club Songs chart, reduced to the same 50 positions, both under the title Hot Dance/Disco. A coupling from MCA Records' Beverly Hills Cop soundtrack, Patti LaBelle's "New Attitude" and Harold Faltermeyer's "Axel F", held the No. 1 slot for the chart's first week and was also No. 1 for the second consecutive week on the most played dance/disco chart.  On June 20, 1992, the chart was renamed Maxi-Singles Sales, then simply Dance Singles Sales on March 1, 2003.

The chart included maxi-singles that did not appear on Club Play by artists of other genres such as rapper 2Pac, the industrial metal band Ministry and alternative rock band the Smiths. "Every Day Is Exactly the Same" by Nine Inch Nails was number one on the sales chart more than any other single at 36 weeks, yet never appeared on the Club Play chart. 

On July 28, 2001, the chart size was reduced to 25 positions after the addition of Top Electronic Albums to the Hot Dance Music section.  Beginning April 30, 2005, these two charts alternated appearing in the magazine every other week until Dance Single Sales became only available at billboard.biz after the magazine's February 24, 2007 issue.   

On January 23, 2010, Billboard debuted Dance/Electronic Digital Song Sales, a 50 position chart ranking of online single sales.  The Dance/Electronic Songs chart was introduced in  Billboard magazine's newly retitled Dance/Electronic music section on January 26, 2013.

After almost 29 years, the last Billboard Dance Singles Sales chart was published online November 30, 2013.

1980s number-one singles
1985
1986
1987
1988
1989

1990s number-one singles
1990
1991
1992
1993
1994
1995
1996
1997
1998
1999

2000s number-one singles
2000
2001
2002
2003
2004
2005
2006
2007
2008
2009

2010s number-one singles
2010
2011
2012
2013

See also
Hot Dance Club Songs
Dance/Mix Show Airplay

References

Billboard charts
Dance-pop